In the 2015–16 season, USM Alger competed in the Ligue 1 for the 38th season, as well as the CAF Champions League, and the Algerian Cup..  It was their 21st consecutive season in the top flight of Algerian football.

Pre-season and friendlies

Competitions

Overview

Ligue 1

League table

Results summary

Results by round

Matches

Algerian Cup

Champions League

Group stage

Group B

Semi-finals

Final

Squad information

Playing statistics

Appearances (Apps.) numbers are for appearances in competitive games only including sub appearances
Red card numbers denote:   Numbers in parentheses represent red cards overturned for wrongful dismissal.

Goalscorers
Includes all competitive matches. The list is sorted alphabetically by surname when total goals are equal.

Assists

Suspensions

Clean sheets
Includes all competitive matches.

Overall seasonal record
Note: Games which are level after extra-time and are decided by a penalty shoot-out are listed as draws.

Squad list
Players and squad numbers last updated on 27 May 2016.Note: Flags indicate national team as has been defined under FIFA eligibility rules. Players may hold more than one non-FIFA nationality.

Transfers

In

Out

References

USM Alger seasons
Algerian football clubs 2015–16 season